Gallinger is a surname. Notable people with the surname include:

Don Gallinger (1925–2000), Canadian ice hockey player
Jacob Harold Gallinger (1837–1918), American politician
Osma Gallinger Tod

See also
Mallinger